William Sinnott (14 August 1886 in Florida – 29 March 1965 in Miami Beach, Florida),  who was awarded a Congressional Gold Medal in 1940 in recognition of his service to President Franklin D. Roosevelt during an assassination attempt on FDR in 1933. A New York City detective, Sinnott had guarded Roosevelt when he was New York governor and was vacationing in Miami at the time of the attack.

Text of legislation
Saturday, 15 June 1940

AN ACT

To authorize the presentation of a special gold medal to William Sinnott.

    Be it enacted by the Senate and House of Representatives of the United States of America in Congress assembled, That the President is authorized to present a special gold medal to William Sinnott, a detective, who in guarding Franklin D. Roosevelt, then President-elect of the United States, at Miami, Florida, on February 15, 1933, was shot and wounded by Giuseppe Zangara, who attempted to assassinate said Franklin D. Roosevelt.  

1886 births
1965 deaths
Congressional Gold Medal recipients